The mixed doubles tennis event at the 2013 Summer Universiade was held from July 8 to 16 at the Tennis Academy in Kazan, Russia.

Seeds
The first seed received a bye into the second round.

Draw

Finals

Top half

Bottom half

References
Main Draw

X